Colm O'Neill (born 20 June 1964) is an Irish former Gaelic footballer. At club level he played with Midleton and was also a member of the Cork senior football team. O'Neill usually lined out as a forward.

Playing career

O'Neill first came to prominence as a dual player at club level with Midleton. It was as a hurler that he enjoyed his greatest club success, winning an All-Ireland Club Championship title in 1988. O'Neill first appeared on the inter-county scene as a member of the Cork minor football team in 1981. He won an All-Ireland Minor Championship title in his debut season after scoring three goals in the final against Derry. A subsequent three-year spell with the under-21 team yielded two consecutive All-Ireland Under-21 Championship titles. O'Neill was still a member of the under-21 team when he was drafted onto the Cork senior football team in 1984. He went on to win consecutive All-Ireland Championship titles in 1989 and 1990, however, he was sent off for striking Mick Lyons in the 1990 All-Ireland final defeat of Meath. O'Neill's other honours with Cork include four consecutive Munster Championship titles and a National League title.

Personal life

O'Neill immigrated to the United States after winning the Diversity Immigrant Visa lottery program. He currently lives in Colorado, and his son Shane is a professional footballer and a former United States youth international.

Honours

Midleton
All-Ireland Senior Club Hurling Championship: 1988
Munster Senior Club Hurling Championship: 1983, 1987
Cork Senior Club Hurling Championship: 1983, 1986, 1987

Cork
All-Ireland Senior Football Championship: 1989, 1990
Munster Senior Football Championship: 1987, 1988, 1989, 1990
National Football League: 1988-89
All-Ireland Under-21 Football Championship: 1984, 1985
Munster Under-21 Football Championship: 1984, 1985
All-Ireland Minor Football Championship: 1981
Munster Minor Football Championship: 1981

References

1964 births
Living people
Dual players
Midleton Gaelic footballers
Midleton hurlers
Cork inter-county Gaelic footballers
Munster inter-provincial Gaelic footballers
Winners of one All-Ireland medal (Gaelic football)